Henry Nissen (26 November 1906 – 14 September 1978) was a Danish weightlifter. He competed in the men's lightweight event at the 1928 Summer Olympics.

References

1906 births
1978 deaths
Danish male weightlifters
Olympic weightlifters of Denmark
Weightlifters at the 1928 Summer Olympics
Sportspeople from Aalborg